Smoke Em If You Get Em is an EP from hip hop artist Cypress Hill. It was released in 2004 and includes one song from the Till Death Do Us Part album of that year. At 11:27 in length, it is the shortest release of any Cypress Hill project.

Track listing 
 What's Your Number (3:51)
 Insane in the Brain (3:23)
 Hand on the Pump (4:03)

References

Cypress Hill albums
2004 EPs